Telman Aliyev (Azerbaijani: Telman Əliyev) is an Azerbaijani scientist.

Experience
 1958-1984, Institute of Control Systems of Azerbaijan National Academy of Sciences, technician, engineer, junior research fellow, senior research fellow, deputy director
 1988-at present, Azerbaijan University of Architecture and Construction, the head of the chair
 1988-2020 Institute of Control Systems, Director
 2020-at present, Advisor of Azerbaijan National Academy of Sciences.

Main results 
Telman Aliev developed the theory and technology of noise analysis of random signals. He also proposed algorithms and technologies for analyzing the noise as a carrier of useful information, showing the possibility of their use in control systems and also for correction of errors of traditional methods of signal analysis. Another important result of his work is a technology for generating equivalent random signals, in which the estimates of the correlation, spectral and other characteristics of the useful signal and the noise coincide with the corresponding estimates of the source random signal. This opened up the possibility of significantly increasing the amount of information retrieved from noisy signals and ensuring a significant increase in the adequacy of solving many important problems. T. Aliev established that at the beginning of the latent period of catastrophic accidents of technical facilities, only the estimates of the noise of the signal change, while the readings of the measuring instruments of control systems remain unchanged, and only the noise becomes the carrier of diagnostic information. As a result, intelligent systems have been developed for Noise control of the beginning, dynamics of development and prediction of accidents on offshore platforms, at oil and gas production facilities at drilling rigs, at power engineering facilities, at pumping stations, in heating systems, on the rolling stock of trains, as well as on the railroad track, bridges and tunnels, etc. On the basis of networks of 10 seismic-acoustic stations for Noise monitoring the beginning of earthquake preparation, an intelligent seismic-acoustic warning system also was created. The system alarms about the start of a change in the seismic situation, determining the zone of the focus of the expected earthquake.

1. The theory and technologies for noise analysis of random noisy signals have been developed. Algorithms and technologies for analyzing the noise as a carrier of useful information have been proposed. The possibility of using them to control the beginning of the latent period of faults, as well as to correct the errors of traditional methods of analysis of random signals, has been shown.

2. It has been shown that in practice, when using traditional correlation and spectral analysis technologies, the adequacy of the results of solving problems of control, diagnostics, identification, etc. is not ensured due to the non-fulfillment of the condition of absence of correlation between the useful signal and the noise. The technology for analyzing noise as a carrier of useful information has been proposed, which allows determining the estimate of the cross-correlation function between the useful signal and the noise, and the noise variance, not only ensuring the adequacy of the solution of these problems, but also significantly expanding the area of practical application of these technologies.

3. A technology has been proposed for forming equivalent random signals, in which the estimates of the correlation, spectral, and other characteristics of the useful signal and the noise coincide with the corresponding estimates of the original random signal. It has been shown that it allows for separate correlation and spectral analysis of the useful signal, the noise, as well as determining the correlations between them, which opens up the possibility of significantly increasing the amount of information extracted from noisy signals and providing a substantial increase in the adequacy of solving many important problems.

4. It has been established that at the beginning of the latent period of accidents of technical objects, only the estimates of the noise of signals change, and the informative attributes and readings of the measuring instruments of the control and management systems do not change. Therefore, the reaction of the system in some cases is delayed, leading to catastrophic accidents. The possibility of using the estimates of noise characteristics as informative attributes of the beginning of accidents has been shown, which results in a significant increase in the degree of operational safety of technical objects.
 
5. Technologies have been proposed for forming correlation matrices of the noisy signal equivalent to matrices of its useful signal, allowing to ensure the adequacy of the results of solving problems of identification, recognition, diagnostics, etc., if such classical conditions as the normality of the distribution law and the absence of correlation between the noise and the useful signal are not satisfied.

6. To ensure the adequacy of the identification results of the beginning of a change in the technical state of objects with a cyclic mode of operation, the technology of positional selective analysis of noisy cyclic signals has been proposed.

7. The theory and technology of robust correlation and spectral analysis of noisy signals has been proposed, which makes it possible to exclude the effects of changes in the noise characteristics on the processing result if such classical conditions as the normality of the distribution law and the absence of correlation between the noise and the useful signal are not satisfied.

8. Technologies have been developed for forming sets of informative attributes, consisting of estimates of Noise characteristics of noisy signals, and on their basis, intelligent systems have been proposed for Noise control of the onset, dynamics of development and prediction of accidents on offshore platforms, at drilling rigs, at power engineering facilities, transport, construction, medicine, etc.

9. The hardware technologies for determining the sampling interval in the process of coding and analysis of continuous noisy random signals have been developed.

10. The possibility of reducing the errors of traditional methods of correlation and spectral analysis of noisy signals using Noise technologies has been shown.

11. Intelligent systems of Noise control and early diagnostics of the vibration state of compressor stations have been created.

12. On the basis of the networks of seismic-acoustic stations for Noise monitoring of the beginning of earthquake preparation, an intelligent seismic-acoustic system for alerting to the beginning of changes in the seismic situation, also locating the focus area of the expected earthquake has been created.

13. The possibility has been shown of forming combinations of informative attributes, consisting of estimates of correlation, spectral characteristics of the noise, a useful signal and the cross-correlation function between them by means of Noise analysis of wattmeter card generators, allowing building intelligent systems for controlling the onset of malfunctions and predicting accidents at artesian wells, pumping stations, heating systems, air conditioning systems, etc.

14. Noise intelligent systems for diagnostics and control of oil wells operated by sucker rod pumping units have been created.

15. For the first time in 1984, the technology and technical means have been created for compression, decompression with restoring ECG and setting up its transmission over a telegraph channel over any distance.

16. A Noise technology has been proposed for forming a set of informative attributes, consisting of Noise characteristics of vibration signals, and on their basis, intelligent systems for monitoring the onset of malfunctions on the running units, on the braking system and on the lubrication system of the rolling stock of trains, as well as on the railway track, on bridges and tunnels.

17. A diagram of connecting the Noise subsystem of control of the beginning of the latent period of accidents to the system of operational diagnostics of equipment of standard operating nuclear power plants has been proposed as an example to improve the safety of the operation of power engineering facilities.

18. Technologies and systems of synchronous sampling, mini-coding, compression and transmission of multidimensional noisy signals have been proposed.

19. A technology for using smartphones and laptops for daily monitoring of the state of the heart by noise analysis of the noise of heart sounds has been proposed.

20. An adaptive positional-selective sampling technology of continuous noisy signals has been proposed, which allows determining the sampling interval based on the high-frequency spectrum of the noise, making it possible to eliminate the difficulties typical of traditional methods.

21. A theory and technologies for analyzing noise as a carrier of useful information have been developed.

22. A theory and positional-binary technology for the analysis of cyclic noisy signals and noises have been developed.

23. The principles of building multichannel analog-to-digital converters with synchronous mini-code-delta modulation and compression of multidimensional continuous signals have been proposed.

24. A technology and system for obtaining and analyzing seismic-acoustic noise, which has the lead over the registration of earthquakes by standard seismic stations by 15–30 hours, have been proposed.

25. The principle of constructing a distributed intelligent system for noise monitoring of the technical state of high-rise buildings and strategic objects of cities in seismically active regions has been proposed.

26. A redundant-frequency technology for analysis and identification of multivariate fast-flowing noisy random processes and indication of microchanges in the technical states of control objects has been proposed.

27. Through an experimental study of the results of robust noise monitoring of seismic-acoustic noise obtained at ten stations built in Azerbaijan, as well as at the station at the foot of the Kopetdag in Turkmenistan, it has been found that with the expansion of the location territory of the stations, it becomes possible to increase the accuracy of determining the location of the earthquake focus area and its magnitude several hours earlier than by the existing ground seismic stations.

28. Proposed noise analysis technologies:

- A technology for analyzing noise as a carrier of useful information, which allows determining the estimate of the cross-correlation function between the useful signal and the noise, and the noise variance, not only ensuring the adequacy of the solution, but also significantly expanding the area of practical application of these technologies.

- A technology for forming equivalent random signals, in which the estimates of the correlation, spectral, and other characteristics of the useful signal and the noise coincide with the corresponding estimates of the original random signal, which opens up the possibility of significantly increasing the amount of information extracted from noisy signals and providing a substantial increase in the adequacy of solving many important problems.

- A technology for using the estimates of noise characteristics as informative attributes of the beginning of accidents, which results in a significant increase in the degree of operational safety of technical objects.

- A technology for forming correlation matrices equivalent to matrices of its useful signal, allowing to ensure the adequacy of the results of solving identification problems.

- A technology of robust correlation and spectral analysis of noisy signals, which allows eliminating the effects of changes in the characteristics of the noise on the processing result.

- A technology for forming a set of informative attributes consisting of the estimates of Noise characteristics of noisy signals, allowing to build intelligent systems for Noise control of the beginning, dynamics of development and predicting accidents on offshore platforms, at drilling rigs, at power engineering facilities, in transport, construction, medicine, etc.

- A network of intelligent seismic acoustic stations for Noise monitoring of the beginning of earthquake preparation processes and alerting to the beginning of changes in the seismic situation, also locating the focus area of the expected earthquake.

- Noise intelligent systems for diagnostics and control of oil wells operated by sucker rod pumping units.

- A technology for using smartphones and laptops for daily monitoring of the state of the heart by Noise analysis of the noise of heart sounds.

Books
 Noise контроль сердца мобильным телефоном
 Noise Control of Heart by Means of a Mobile Phone
 Noise Technologies for Minimization of Damage Caused by Earthquakes
 Digital Noise Monitoring of Defect Origin
 Robust Technology with Analysis of Interference in Signal Processing
 Помехотехнологии минимализации ущерба от землетрясений
 Робастный компьютерный анализ
 Основы экспериментального анализа
 Экспериментальный анализ

Scientific achievements
 Theory and technology for robust correlation and spectral analysis of noisy signals that allows for eliminating the effects of noise on the processing results in the case of non-compliance with such classical conditions as the normal distribution law and absence of a correlation between the noise and the useful signal do not hold.
 Theory and technology for improving the adequacy of identification, recognition and diagnostics in the case of non-compliance with such classical conditions as the normal distribution law and absence of a correlation between the noise and the useful signal do not hold.
 Theory and technology for the analysis of noise as a carrier of useful information.
 Theory and technology for noise monitoring of the latent period of origin of faults and noise prediction of industrial accidents.
 Design principles of multichannel analog-to-digital converters with synchronous mini-code delta modulation and compression of multidimensional continuous signals.
 Technology and system for receiving and noise analysis of seismic-acoustic information from the deep strata of the earth by means of oil wells which allow one to predict the time of registration of earthquakes by standard seismic stations.

Medals and rewords
 Keldysh medal - 1991
 Honour Medal of Azerbaijan  Republic - 2004

References

External links
 http://www.TelmanAliev.az
 http://www.Science.az
 http://www.Cyber.az

1935 births
Living people
Azerbaijani engineers
Azerbaijani academicians